Mirs Bay (also known as Tai Pang Wan, Dapeng Wan, Dapeng Bay, or Mers Bay) is a bay in the northeast of Kat O and Sai Kung Peninsula of Hong Kong. The north and east shores are surrounded by Yantian and Dapeng New District of Shenzhen. Ping Chau stands in the midst of the bay.

History

Mirs Bay, along with other waterways near Hong Kong, was once was home to various coastal defences (e.g. Dapeng Fortress) used against pirates during the Ming Dynasty.

Mirs Bay was used by then American Commodore (later Admiral) George Washington Dewey during the Spanish–American War as a refuge and repair facility for the US Navy.

In 1949, the colonial government imposed a curfew under the Public Order Ordinance forbidding movement of watercraft in Mirs Bay  between 10 PM and 6 AM without written permission of the Hong Kong Police Force. The order remains in force after the 1997 handover of Hong Kong. For purposes of the order, the dividing line between Tolo Channel and Mirs Bay runs from Wong Chuk Kok Tsui to Ngo Keng Tsui.

Features
Within the bay are numerous smaller harbors and inlets on the Hong Kong side:
 Starling Inlet
 Tai Po Hoi
 Kat O Hoi
 Tai Tan Hoi
 Sha Tin Hoi
 Hoi Ha Bay

The bay includes a number of islands, with an extensive group lying in the northwestern part of the bay, including:
 Double Island
 Crescent Island
 Crooked Island
 Grass Island, at the western side of the entrance to Mirs Bay
 Round Island

To the south of Mirs Bay, water flows out to the South China Sea.

References

External links

  showing Mirs Bay and major islands
 

Bays of Hong Kong
Geography of Shenzhen
Bays of Guangdong
Dapeng New District